Artem Shmakov (born March 6, 1990, in Chelyabinsk) is a Russian curler.

At the national level, he is a two-time Russian men's champion curler (2013, 2014) and a 2018 Russian mixed champion.

Teams

Men's

Mixed

Mixed doubles

References

External links

ШМАКОВ Артем | Российские спортсмены и специалисты | Спортивная Россия
Video: 

Living people
1990 births
Sportspeople from Chelyabinsk
Curlers from Saint Petersburg
Russian male curlers
Russian curling champions